The Motion of Light in Water: Sex and Science Fiction Writing in the East Village, is the autobiography of the science fiction author Samuel R. Delany in which he recounts his experiences growing up as a gay African American man, as well as some of his time in an interracial and open marriage with Marilyn Hacker. It describes encounters with Albert Einstein, Bob Dylan, Stokely Carmichael and Stormé DeLarverie, a dinner with W. H. Auden, and a phone call to James Baldwin. 

Among many cultural events of the decade that he witnessed, Delany recounts his attendance at the first New York City performance of the artist Allan Kaprow's 18 Happenings in 6 Parts, the 1959 performance piece that, for many, marked the end of modernism and the beginning of postmodernism. In section 17.4 of the University of Minnesota Press edition, he describes the event and its venue, and speculates on its artistic significance. The introduction puts an emphasis on the idea of the unreliable narrator; Delany's accounts often contrast his life as it "felt" to ways in which it actually occurred.

Awards
 1989 Hugo Award for Best Non-Fiction Book

Legacy 
Hazel Carby called it one of two contemporary autobiographies that are "absolutely central to any consideration of black manhood" (the other being that of Miles Davis). 

In the chapter, "The Future Is in the Present" of the book Cruising Utopia by José Esteban Munoz, Delany's The Motion of Light in the Water serves to explain how the future, as a form of utopia, can be "glimpsed" in the present through what Delany employed as "the massed bodies" of sexual dissidence. 

Masha Gessen in O, The Oprah Magazine selected this title as a pick for the "Best LGBTQ Books of All Time", describing it as "a textbook in observing the self, thinking about sex and love, and the best writing manual I know".

Publication history

The first edition is subtitled "1957–1965", the revised 1993 edition is subtitled "1960–1965".

References

External links
Review of Delany's autobiography by Jo Walton

Hugo Award for Best Non-Fiction Book winning works
Books by Samuel Delany
1988 non-fiction books
Science fiction studies
African-American autobiographies
Literary autobiographies
Gay non-fiction books
LGBT autobiographies
LGBT literature in the United States
University of Minnesota Press books
1980s LGBT literature
Arbor House books